Maurice Frilot (November 29, 1940 – October 30, 2021) was an American boxer. He competed in the men's welterweight event at the 1964 Summer Olympics. At the 1964 Summer Olympics, he lost to Ernest Mabwa of Uganda by decision in the Round of 32. Frilot died on October 30, 2021, at the age of 80.

References

External links
 

1940 births
2021 deaths
Welterweight boxers
American male boxers
Olympic boxers of the United States
Boxers at the 1964 Summer Olympics
Boxers from Denver